Yixueyuan (literally "Medical College") is a metro station of Zhengzhou Metro Line 1. The station lies beneath the crossing of Zhongyuan Road and Daxue Road.

Station layout 

The station has 2 floors underground. The B1 floor is for the station concourse and the B2 floor is for the platforms and tracks. The station has one island platform and two tracks for Line 1.

Exits

Future development
The station is planned to be a three-line interchange station among Line 1, Line 7 and Line 10. The Line 10 is currently under construction.

Surroundings
Zhengzhou University Medical College
Zhengzhou University (old campus)
First Affiliated Hospital of Zhengzhou University

References

Stations of Zhengzhou Metro
Line 1, Zhengzhou Metro
Railway stations in China opened in 2013